The 2011–12 Columbus Blue Jackets season was the team's 12th season in the National Hockey League (NHL). The Blue Jackets' record of 29–46–7 was the worst record in the NHL for 2011–12 and the first time in franchise history they finished in last place. It also marked the third straight year that they missed the playoffs. Consequently, they had the best chance to receive the first overall selection in the 2012 NHL Entry Draft lottery, but lost out to the Edmonton Oilers and received the second pick instead.

The Blue Jackets began the year with the worst start in franchise history and the worst by any team in an NHL season in 19 years. After an 11–25–5 start, head coach Scott Arniel was fired and replaced by assistant coach Todd Richards. The poor season prompted several personnel changes, including the trade of All-Star forward Jeff Carter, who was acquired with much fanfare during the off-season. With the prospect of another rebuild looming the Blue Jackets' captain and best player, Rick Nash, requested to be traded, though he would remain with the team for the entire season.

The team was involved in a controversial loss to the Los Angeles Kings, when the Staples Center clock appeared to freeze at 1.8 seconds allowing the Kings time to score the tying goal, before winning in overtime. During the season Columbus managed only two winning streaks of three or more games. One of which came towards the end of the year helping the Blue Jackets finish with 65 points, the third worst point total in franchise history.

Off-season
 
In the off-season, the Blue Jackets' approach to building their team changed, moving from a team of young developing players into one with established players. The first deal General Manager Scott Howson made was the acquisition of All-Star forward Jeff Carter on June 23, 2011. The deal sent Jakub Voracek, Columbus' first-round draft choice, the eighth overall, and their third-round pick in the 2011 Draft to the Philadelphia Flyers in exchange for Carter. The trade received a positive response in Columbus from fans and management who felt they finally had a number one center to play alongside of their best player, Rick Nash. Next, they traded for the negotiating rights of soon to be free agent James Wisniewski. Wisniewski scored a career-high 51 points during the 2010–11 season, splitting time between the New York Islanders and Montreal Canadiens. The point total was fifth-highest in the league for defenseman scoring, tying Tobias Enstrom. The Blue Jackets came to terms with Wisniewski just one hour prior to the start of free agency, signing him to a six-year, $33 million contract.

Columbus also traded former first round draft pick Nikita Filatov to the Ottawa Senators for a third-round pick in the 2011 Draft. Filatov had failed to live up to expectations in Columbus, playing in only 44 games over three seasons scoring six goals. Prior to the start of the season, the Blue Jackets were questioned for not signing a veteran back-up to starting goaltender Steve Mason, as the former Calder Memorial Trophy winner had struggled in consecutive seasons. The Blue Jackets signed Mark Dekanich as the back-up who had only 50 minutes of NHL experience prior to the start of the season. Columbus did sign a veteran Curtis Sanford to be their third string goaltender and to start for their American Hockey League (AHL) affiliate, the Springfield Falcons. Sanford had not played in the NHL since 2009. During training camp, Dekanich suffered a high ankle sprain that was expected to keep him out of the line-up for a month. Additionally, Sanford suffered a groin injury, leaving Allen York as the back-up. York had only played four professional games, all in the AHL, entering the season.

Regular season

October – December 

After the first five games, all losses, Jeff Carter suffered a broken foot that kept him out of the line-up for 10 games. While Carter was injured, the Blue Jackets continued to lose games. In the eighth game of the year, they had a chance to end the losing streak against the Ottawa Senators. Columbus held a 3–2 lead with under a minute to play. Jason Spezza tied the game on a late power play, and with just 4.7 seconds remaining, Milan Michalek notched the winning goal for the Senators. The loss helped set a franchise record for futility with a 0–7–1 record to start a season. The losing streak came to an end three days later with a win over the Detroit Red Wings. During the game, several milestones were reached. James Wisniewski made his Columbus debut, Ryan Johansen and John Moore scored their first career NHL goals and Grant Clitsome had a career-high three assists. Columbus was unable to create any momentum from the win, however, and continued to struggle, culminating in a 2–12–1 record, which was the worst start to an NHL season for any team in 19 years. With the team struggling, management attempted to "shake things up" by making some roster moves. The first move was the acquisition of center Mark Letestu from the Pittsburgh Penguins. Next, they traded defenseman Kris Russell to the St. Louis Blues for Nikita Nikitin. As the clubs slow start continued, there were rumors that Head Coach Scott Arniel would be fired and replaced with Ken Hitchcock. Hitchcock had previously coached the Blue Jackets to their only playoff appearance in club history and was still under contract with the franchise through to the end of the season. Before any of these rumors came to fruition, the St. Louis Blues asked Columbus for permission to hire Hitchcock, which the Blue Jackets allowed. Hitchcock began his Blues coaching career with a 6–1–2 record in his first nine games, while Columbus amassed a 6–13–3 record to start the season.

During the same time frame as the Hitchcock rumors, goaltender Curtis Sanford returned from his groin injury on November 13. He made his first start of the season against the Boston Bruins, losing 2–1 in a shootout. Sanford continued his strong play, posting a 3–1–2 record, 1.38 goals against average and .947 save percentage over his next six games. Sanford started 12 consecutive games before Steve Mason made his next start. The number of starts might not have been as numerous, but prior to the November 23 game, Mason was hit in the head by a shot from Rick Nash during pre-game warm-ups and suffered a concussion. Mason returned from his concussion after two games, making a start against the Vancouver Canucks. Mason allowed only one goal in the game despite suffering from cramping in the third period, temporarily being replaced by Sanford for just over three minutes. Columbus won the game 2–1 in a shootout, breaking a nine-game losing streak to the Canucks. After the game, Arniel stated that Sanford was still seen as the team's number one goaltender. However, Mason started four of the next six games with the Blue Jackets going 0–5–1 during that stretch.

January – February

With the losing continuing, more rumors began to surface. Unlike before, the rumors were about player moves rather than coaching changes. The majority of rumors were that the Blue Jackets would trade Rick Nash. While Howson stated that he had never brought up trading Nash in discussions, other teams had inquired about his availability. Nash stated that if Columbus felt it would make the franchise better than he would be willing to waive his no-trade clause. Howson publicly stated that he had no intention of trading Nash. More rumors came to light when reports attributed to Réseau des sports stated that Carter was unhappy in Columbus and demanded a trade. Howson, Carter and his agent all denied that a trade request was ever made, and they were unsure where the reports were coming from. With the trade deadline approaching, speculation picked up on the Blue Jackets trading Carter. Reports were that Columbus was trying to trade Carter and that he was "100 percent available."

At the halfway point of the season, the Blue Jackets with an 11–25–5 record, worst in the league, and sitting 20 points out of playoff position, Columbus fired Arniel. He was replaced by Assistant Coach Todd Richards on an interim basis. Richards had previously coached the Minnesota Wild. He recorded his first coaching victory for the Blue Jackets in his second game, a 4–3 win over the Phoenix Coyotes. The change in coaching did not change the fortunes of the team, as they reached the All-Star break with a 13–30–6 record. At the break, Blue Jackets' owner John P. McConnell sent out a letter to fans stating his understanding of their frustration. He added that action would be taken around the trade deadline, the Entry Draft and free agency to take the team in a new direction. When speaking of the season, McConnell stated "disappointing is not a strong enough word" and that he was committed to giving fans a team of which they can be proud of. He also thanked them for their dedication and passion, while reiterating that the team goal was to "win consistently and compete for the Stanley Cup." Days later, a 250-person protest occurred outside of Nationwide Arena. Fans were upset with the Blue Jackets' management and were calling for changes at the top. The same day the fans protested, it was announced that the franchise would host the 2013 All-Star Game. Columbus was without a representative for the 2012 All-star Game, but Ryan Johansen represented the club as a rookie participant in the Super Skills Competition. In the competition, Johansen participated in the Allstate Insurance NHL Breakaway Challenge, a shootout themed event judged by the fans. He received just 1% of the vote and finished last.

Following the break, the Blue Jackets were on the road playing the Los Angeles Kings, and with the score tied late in the game, Kings' defenseman Drew Doughty scored with just 0.4 seconds remaining to win the game. Upon review of the goal it, was determined that the clock at Staples Center froze at 1.8 seconds for over a full second, which would have resulted in time expiring prior to the goal being scored. Kings' General Manager Dean Lombardi stated that the clock was correct and no extra time had been added due to the way the clock self-corrects at various times. Howson stated on the team's blog that "It is an amazing coincidence that with the Kings on a power play at Staples Center and with a mad scramble around our net in the dying seconds of the third period of a 2–2 hockey game that the clock stopped for at least one full second," adding that, "Either there was a deliberate stopping of the clock or the clock malfunctioned." NHL Senior Vice President of Hockey Operations Colin Campbell stated that the Blue Jackets were wronged, but that the outcome of the game could not be changed, and that the delay was not noticed by the off-ice officials or the situation room in Toronto. To determine the true cause of the clock pause, the NHL launched an investigation, talking with the clock's manufacturer and interviewing Staples Center staff.

Two weeks prior to the NHL trade deadline, Columbus announced that unlike earlier in the season, they would listen to trade proposals involving Rick Nash, though they were not actively shopping him. Howson stated that the team was open to all options for improving the team, including trading Nash. Speculation was that in return for Nash the Blue Jackets would ask for a "combination of young, proven players, high-end prospects and draft picks." Leading up to the trade deadline, the Blue Jackets dealt Antoine Vermette to the Phoenix Coyotes for two draft picks and goaltender Curtis McElhinney. Despite being injured at the time, the acquisition of McElhinney was believed to give Columbus the flexibility to trade Curtis Sanford. The following day, on February 23, Columbus traded Jeff Carter to the Kings. In the deal, Columbus acquired defenseman Jack Johnson and a first-round draft pick; the team was given the choice of taking the pick in either 2012 or 2013. At the deadline, Columbus was unable to come to terms on a deal involving Nash, but they did make one more move; they sent center Samuel Pahlsson to the Vancouver Canucks in exchange for two fourth-round draft picks and minor league defenseman Taylor Ellington. Following the trade deadline, Howson announced that the team had attempted to trade Nash at the player's request. Nash stated that he had requested the trade after being informed that the franchise was going into another rebuilding phase. He further noted that he felt that he "could be a huge part of that towards bringing assets in," and in his view "it was the best thing for the team, the organization, and personally for [his] career." After the personnel changes, the Blue Jackets closed out the month with a three-game losing streak.

March – April

Columbus started March with a 2–0 shutout against the Colorado Avalanche. They proceeded to win their next game against the Phoenix Coyotes 5–2, which marked the first time that the Blue Jackets posted back-to-back regulation victories during the season. Columbus again defeated the Coyotes three days later to earn their first three-game win streak of the season. They extended the streak to four with a win over the Los Angeles Kings before it came to an end with a 4–1 loss to the St. Louis Blues. It was the only four-game win streak of the season for the Blue Jackets. They immediately matched their four-game win streak with a four-game losing streak and with ten games remaining, the Blue Jackets were the first team eliminated from playoff contention. Shortly after being eliminated, they were defeated by the Edmonton Oilers 6–3; the loss clinched last place in the NHL for Columbus. It was the first time in franchise history the Blue Jackets finished in 30th place.

Three days later, on March 28, goaltender Steve Mason was injured in the morning skate when a shot from Colton Gillies hit him in the mask. With Sanford again injured, York made an emergency start. Playing against the Detroit Red Wings, York made 29 saves, including 17 in the third period, helping Columbus to a 4–2 victory and giving York his first career NHL win. York remained the starter and led the Blue Jackets to a second three-game winning streak. In his fourth start, Columbus was shut out by the Coyotes despite a franchise-record 54 shots on goal, losing 2–0. The 54 saves by Phoenix goaltender Mike Smith set an NHL record for a regulation shutout. Mason returned to the starter's role for the final two games, winning both. The two victories gave Columbus 65 points for the year, their third-lowest total in franchise history.

The Blue Jackets struggled in shorthanded situations, allowing the most power-play goals in the league, with 64, and having the lowest penalty-kill percentage, at 76.64%.

Post-season
Finishing with the worst record in the NHL, Columbus had the best chance of receiving the first overall pick in the 2012 draft. With the NHL's weighted draft lottery the Blue Jackets had a 48.2% chance of drafting first overall. However, the lottery was won by the Edmonton Oilers, who proceeded to leapfrog Columbus and secure the number one draft pick for a third consecutive year. It was the fifth time that the Blue Jackets were dropped one draft position in the franchise's 12 lottery participations.

A month later, on May 14, the Blue Jackets announced that Richards would remain as head coach and signed him to a two-year contract. During the press conference, Howson noted, "Our team continuously improved under Todd and he has earned the opportunity to build upon the work he started." Columbus posted an 18–21–2 record under Richards, including winning seven of their final 11 games.

Standings
Since being founded as an expansion team, the Blue Jackets have played in the Central Division of the Western Conference. Division rivals Chicago Blackhawks, Detroit Red Wings, Nashville Predators and St. Louis Blues, all made the playoff during the 2011–12 season, which helped Columbus finish 36 points behind fourth place Chicago and 44 points out of first.

Schedule and results

Pre-season

Regular season
 Green background indicates win (2 points).
 Red background indicates regulation loss (0 points).
 Silver background indicates overtime/shootout loss (1 point).

Player statistics
In ice hockey, a combination of a player's goals and assists are collectively called points. Penalty minutes are the total number of minutes assigned to a player for infractions assessed during the season. Plus-minus is a statistic that tracks when a player was on the ice while goals were scored, both for and against their team, though some in game situations will not effect the statistic. Below is a listing of all player statistics for the Blue Jackets during the season.

Skaters
Note: Pos = Position; GP = Games played in; G = Goals; A = Assists; Pts = Points; PIM = Penalty minutes; +/- = Plus/minus

Goaltenders
Note: GP = Games played; TOI = Time on ice (minutes); W = Wins; L = Losses; OT = Overtime Losses; GA = Goals against; GAA= Goals against average; SA= Shots against; SV= Saves; Sv% = Save percentage; SO= Shutouts

†Denotes player spent time with another team before joining Blue Jackets. Stats reflect time with the Blue Jackets only.
‡Traded mid-season

Milestones
When Mason was injured in warm-ups late in the year, Columbus was without an active goaltender on their roster. To remedy the situation, the team signed former University of Michigan goaltender Shawn Hunwick to a one-day, amateur tryout contract. After being eliminated from the NCAA Tournament just days prior, Hunwick skipped an astronomy class and drove his worn down 2003 Ford Ranger to Columbus to make the game. He served as the back-up to Allen York during the game, and the following day, he signed a contract for the remainder of the year. With Mason returning from injury, Hunwick was third on the team's depth chart when an injury to York allowed Hunwick to remain as the back-up for the final two games of the year. In the final game of the season, the Blue Jackets were leading the Islanders 7–3 with 2:33 remaining when, at the behest of his teammates, Head Coach Todd Richards put Hunwick in to finish the game. He did not face a shot. Hunwick was the franchise record ninth player to make his NHL debut during the season. Conversely, Vaclav Prospal played in his 1,000th NHL game during the year.

Transactions 
During the off-season the Blue Jackets parted ways with defensemen Jan Hejda, Anton Stralman, Sami Lepisto and Mike Commodore. Hejda, who played four of his first five NHL seasons with the Blue Jackets, was offered a contract by Columbus, but felt that the organization undervalued him and left via free agency. Columbus had offered him a three-year, $7.5 million contract. He instead signed a four-year, $13 million deal with the Colorado Avalanche. Stralman and Lepisto were not given qualifying offers which made them unrestricted free agents, and both signed with other teams. Commodore had originally signed a big contract with the Blue Jackets in 2008, but fell out of favor. He was waived, sent to the minors and eventually had his contract bought out. In order to replace the departed players, Columbus not only acquired James Wisniewski, but also signed ten-year NHL veteran Radek Martinek. Martinek played only seven games with the Blue Jackets before suffering a concussion and missing the remainder of the season. Brett Lebda was brought in to replace him.

Trades

Free agents signed

Free agents lost

Claimed via waivers

Lost via waivers

Player signings

2011 Draft picks 

The 2011 NHL Entry Draft was held in Saint Paul, Minnesota, on June 24 and 25. In the draft, Columbus selected two players who were projected to go higher in the draft. Boone Jenner, a projected second line center, was expected to be a first-round selection, but slipped to the second round. Seth Ambroz, a projected third line enforcer, had some believing he would be taken in the second round prior to falling to the fifth. They filled out the other the remainder of their draft with players considered to have a high upside, but in need of time to develop their game. Their final selection, goaltender Anton Forsberg, was taken following the recommendation of Goaltender Coach Ian Clark. Jenner (Canada), third round pick T. J. Tynan (United States), and Forsberg (Sweden) all played for their national teams at the 2012 World Junior Championship.

sources:  
Draft notes
 The Blue Jackets first and third round picks in the draft, along with Jakub Voracek were traded to the Philadelphia Flyers in exchange for Jeff Carter. 
 The Blue Jackets acquired the Ottawa Senators' third round pick in exchange for Nikita Filatov.

See also 
 2011–12 NHL season

Notes
1: The NHL uses a point system for their standings that awards two points for a win and one point an overtime or shootout loss. The denotation of a team's record is wins-losses-overtime/shootout losses.

References

Columbus Blue Jackets seasons
Columbus Blue Jackets season, 2011-12
Colum
Blue
Blue